The 1914 TCU football team represented Texas Christian University (TCU) in the 1914 college football season. Led by Stanley A. Boles in his first and only year as head coach, TCU compiled an overall record of 4–4–2. The team's captain was Crawford Reeder, who played center. The Frogs played their home games in Fort Worth, Texas.

Schedule

References

TCU
TCU Horned Frogs football seasons
TCU football